Sunny Hill School is a non-profit, private education institution located in Kuching, the capital of Sarawak, Malaysia. It is operated by the Seventh-day Adventist Mission of Sarawak and educates children from ages 2/3 (Nursery) to 17/18 (Form 5).

History
Sunny Hill School traces its roots to 1925 when local Adventist missionaries and church members rented two shophouses to teach their children. A building was erected the following year and the school opened its doors to the public for the first time. Initially only a primary and secondary school, the kindergarten division opened in 1975. In 1988 the school completed its biggest single building project to date and the new complex was opened by YB Tan Sri Datuk Amar Sim Kheng Hong, then the Deputy Chief Minister of Sarawak.

Organisation
Sunny Hill School comprises three divisions: Sunny Hill Kindergarten (Malay: Taska Gemilang), Sunny Hill Primary School (Malay: Sekolah Rendah Sunny Hill) and Sunny Hill Secondary School (Malay: Sekolah Menengah Sunny Hill).

Curriculum
Sunny Hill Nursery uses the PERMATA Negara programme. The kindergarten, primary and secondary schools utilize their respective relevant national curriculum as mandated by the Malaysian Ministry of Education. All Year 6 students sit for the UPSR and Form 5 students sit for the school leaving examination SPM. The STPM (Form 6) is not offered.

English enrichment
The secondary school uses English as the medium of instruction in mathematics and the sciences. In 2013 the Cambridge English syllabus was adopted for all students entering Form 1. Additional English language enrichment classes are provided for Form 1 students and prepare them for the Key English Test.

Students are allotted six periods to study and read the Cambridge Young Learners’ English (YLE) which comprises three levels: "starters", "movers", and "flyers", thus providing a consistent measure on how well students are doing in the skill of listening, speaking, reading and writing. Lessons are designed to make learning fun and children are encouraged to work towards certificates that record their progress. This sets international standards in our primary school English for teachers as well as students.

Co-curricular and extracurricular activities
These extra-curricular activities provide the opportunity for students to develop good personality traits and social skills. They are organised according to the club’s objectives.
 Pathfinder & Adventurer Clubs
 Needle Craft Club 
 Cultural Club 
 Cooking Club 
 Futsal Club 
 Football Club
 Basketball Club
 Badminton Club
 Table Tennis Club
 English & Music Club
 Board Games Club
 Library Club

Alumni
The Sunny Hill School Ex-Student Association was established by the class of 1969.

Gallery

See also

 List of schools in Sarawak

References

External links
 

Buildings and structures in Kuching
Schools in Sarawak
Secondary schools in Malaysia
Secondary schools affiliated with the Seventh-day Adventist Church